Banana Dance may refer to:

 Dancing Banana is a popular emoticon
 Danse sauvage, an exotic dance performed by Josephine Baker
 "Dr. Jean's Banana Dance", a song and video by American children's author and musician Dr. Jean
 A skit performed by American comedian Chris Elliott
 "The Banana Dance", an episode of Australian television series Bananas in Pyjamas